Collective effervescence (CE) is a sociological concept coined by Émile Durkheim. According to Durkheim, a community or society may at times come together and simultaneously communicate the same thought and participate in the same action. Such an event then causes collective effervescence which excites individuals and serves to unify the group.

In religion 
Collective effervescence is the basis for Émile Durkheim's theory of religion as laid out in his 1912 volume Elementary Forms of Religious Life. Durkheim argues that the universal religious dichotomy of profane and sacred results from the lives of these tribe members: most of their life is spent performing menial tasks such as hunting and gathering. These tasks are profane. The rare occasions on which the entire tribe gathers together become sacred, and the high energy level associated with these events gets directed onto physical objects or people which also become sacred.

The force is thus associated with the totem which is the symbol of the clan, mentioned by Durkheim in his study of "elementary forms" of religion in Aboriginal societies. Because it provides the tribe's name, the symbol is present during the gathering of the clan. Through its presence in these gatherings, the totem comes to represent both the scene and the strongly felt emotion, and thus becomes a collective representation of the group.

For Durkheim, religion is a fundamentally social phenomenon. The beliefs and practices of the sacred are a method of social organization. This explanation is detailed in Elementary Forms "Book 2/The Elementary Beliefs", chapter 7, "Origins of These Beliefs: Origin of the Idea of the Totemic Principle or Mana". According to Durkheim, "god and society are one of the same…the god of the clan…can be none other than the clan itself, but the clan transfigured and imagined in the physical form of a plant or animal that serves as a totem."

The group members experience a feeling of a loss of individuality and unity with the gods and according to Durkheim, thus with the group.

See also 

Bandwagon effect
Crowd psychology
Collective action
Collective behavior
Collective consciousness
Collective hysteria
Collective intelligence
Echo chamber (media)
Herd behavior
Herd instinct
Hooliganism
Football hooliganism
Group action (sociology)
Group behaviour
Group cohesiveness
Groupthink
Limbic resonance
Mass action (sociology)
Ochlocracy
Peer pressure
Psychology of religion
Social comparison theory
Spiral of silence
Superorganism

References

Sources 
Durkheim, Émile. The Elementary Forms of the Religious Life, (1912, English translation by Joseph Swain: 1915) The Free Press, 1965: ; HarperCollins, 1976: ;  new translation by Karen E. Fields, Free Press 1995: 
Griswold, Wendy, Cultures and Societies in a Changing World, Pine Forge Press, 2008; 51-56.
Kunin, Seth D. Religion; the modern theories, University of Edinburgh, 2003: 

Crowd psychology
Émile Durkheim
Sociological terminology
Violence